Zarevo may refer to:
Zarevo, Russia, a settlement in the Republic of Adygea, Russia
Zarevo, Serbia, a settlement in Raška municipality, Serbia
Zarevo, a village in Targovishte Province, Bulgaria